Jensia is a genus of flowering plants in the family Asteraceae, endemic to California.

 Species
 Jensia rammii (Greene) B.G.Baldwin - Sierra Nevada foothills (Butte Co to Calaveras Co with report of isolated population in Tulare Co)
 Jensia yosemitana (Parry ex A.Gray) B.G.Baldwin - Sierra Nevada from (Nevada Co to Kern Co)

References

Asteraceae genera
Madieae
Endemic flora of California
Flora without expected TNC conservation status